Rolf Gisler (born 3 October 1953) is a Swiss sprinter. He competed in the men's 4 × 400 metres relay at the 1980 Summer Olympics.

References

1953 births
Living people
Athletes (track and field) at the 1980 Summer Olympics
Swiss male sprinters
Olympic athletes of Switzerland
Place of birth missing (living people)